NowThis News is a progressive social media-focused news organization founded in 2012. The company posts short (in most cases 15 seconds long) news videos and hyperpartisan content.

History 
NowThis News was founded by Huffington Post co-founder and former chairman Kenneth Lerer and former Huffington Post CEO Eric Hippeau in September 2012.

NowThis originally focused exclusively on social-media platforms such as Facebook, having announced in 2015 that it would not have a homepage. By 2018, it had changed this position.

On December 8, 2015, NowThis News raised $16.2m in Series D funding. By this time, the company has said that 68% of its audience were millennials between the ages of 18–34. It was announced that this funding would be used to launch more focused channels.

Between 2012 and 2014, the editor-in-chief was Edward O'Keefe, who previously was the executive producer at ABC News Digital.

As of 2013, NowThis News produced about 50 segments per day and received about 15–20 million views per month.

In 2016, NowThis joined with The Dodo, Thrillist, and Seeker to form Group Nine Media, which was acquired by Vox Media in February 2022.

On March 17, 2017, NowThis News took over the YouTube channel Seeker Daily (previously known as TestTube) as a campaign to launch the network on YouTube.  As of April 1, 2017, the channel had stopped posting videos to the channel.

Former Channel 4 News head of digital Jon Laurence joined as deputy editor in January 2018.

In June 2020, numerous accusations of sexual misconduct were levied at NowThis associate producer Jackson Davis after being retweeted by Alexandria Ocasio-Cortez. NowThis News suspended Davis and, following an external investigation, removed him from the company.

Content 
NowThis News' videos are primarily emotion-driven in order to generate views and shares.

An analysis from BuzzFeed News found that NowThis News was the most popular left-leaning site on Facebook between 2015 and 2017, and, along with Occupy Democrats, accounted for half of the 50 top posts on Facebook.

In 2015, NowThis News published a conspiracy theory which claimed that CNN deleted a poll of Facebook users asserting that most participants thought that Bernie Sanders beat Hillary Clinton in the first Democratic presidential debate. NowThis News created a video titled "It looks like CNN is trying to help Hillary look good, even if that means deleting polls." However, PolitiFact found that CNN did not delete the poll in question and in fact displayed the results of the poll during its broadcast and also published the poll on its Facebook page. The claim was rated as "Pants on Fire" false by PolitiFact.

After Donald Trump was elected president in 2016, NowThis News posted a clip of CNN commentator Van Jones giving a speech about the election results on their social media. The posted clip generated over 23 million views on Facebook, and NowThis News included its own logo in the upper corner, not CNN's. CNN accused NowThis News of violating their intellectual property rights and stated that video "was used without attribution or permission" and they were "exploring [their] options with regards to NowThis, Facebook and Twitter." NowThis News removed the clip from their Facebook, though it remained on their Twitter.

During the 2016 presidential election, NowThis News repeatedly claimed that Donald Trump lied about Bill Clinton signing the North American Free Trade Agreement using videos posted on Facebook and YouTube. PolitiFact found that Bill Clinton did in fact sign the final version of the North American Free Trade Agreement as Trump had stated, and rated the claim false.

In September 2019, NowThis News tweeted out that "Republicans in North Carolina used a 9/11 memorial to trick Democrats into missing a key vote," which was later shared by senator Elizabeth Warren. PolitiFact rated the claim false and discovered only one Democrat was at a 9/11 memorial during the time North Carolina Republicans held a controversial budget vote. NowThis News did not correct their claim.

In January 2020, NowThis News removed a segment of a video they posted where a George Washington University student falsely claimed that Holocaust diarist Anne Frank did not die in a concentration camp (Frank died in the Bergen-Belsen concentration camp in either February or March 1945).

References

External links

American news websites
Mass media companies based in New York City
American companies established in 2012
Internet properties established in 2012
Mass media about Internet culture
Mass media companies established in 2012
2012 establishments in New York City
Progressive organizations in the United States
Podcasting companies
Vox Media